Lisa Marie Chesters (born 11 February 1980) is an Australian politician. She is a member of the Australian Labor Party (ALP) and has been a member of the House of Representatives since 2013, representing the Division of Bendigo. Prior to her election to parliament she worked as a union organiser for United Voice.

Early life
Chesters was born in Wentworthville, New South Wales. Her parents owned a small business, although her mother Jenny Chesters later completed a PhD as a mature-age student and became an academic.

Chesters holds the degree of Bachelor of Arts from the University of Queensland. She was involved in student politics, serving as secretary of the University of Queensland Union in 2002 and as women's officer of the National Union of Students in 2003. She subsequently worked as an organiser for United Voice from 2003 to 2013.

Politics
Prior to her election to parliament, Chesters held senior positions in the Australian Labor Party (Victorian Branch), serving on the administrative committee, as a delegate to state and national conference, and as president of the women's affairs policy committee.

Parliament
Chesters was elected to the House of Representatives at the 2013 federal election, retaining the Division of Bendigo for the ALP following the retirement of Steve Gibbons. She is the first woman to represent the seat, which has existed since Federation in 1901. She was re-elected at the 2016, 2019 and 2022 federal elections.

After the 2016 election, Chesters was promoted to Bill Shorten's shadow ministry as a shadow assistant minister, holding the portfolios of "workplace relations" and "rural and regional Australia". She did not retain her place when Anthony Albanese succeeded Shorten as party leader following the 2019 election.

Personal life
Chesters is in a long-term relationship with Matt Emond. Their first child was born in 2019. Their second child was born in 2021.

In 2018, Chesters was diagnosed with conjuctival melanoma, a rare eye cancer. She received surgical treatment and radiotherapy.

References

 

1980 births
Living people
Australian Labor Party members of the Parliament of Australia
Labor Left politicians
Members of the Australian House of Representatives for Bendigo
Members of the Australian House of Representatives
Women members of the Australian House of Representatives
21st-century Australian politicians
21st-century Australian women politicians
University of Queensland alumni
Australian trade unionists